Alberto Mancini was the defending champion, but did not compete this year.

Javier Sánchez won the title by defeating Franco Davín 6–1, 6–0 in the final.

Seeds

Draw

Finals

Top half

Bottom half

References

External links
 Official results archive (ATP)
 Official results archive (ITF)

Bologna Outdoor
1989 Grand Prix (tennis)